Svetlana Laukhova (Cyrillic: Светлана Лаухова; born 1 February 1973) is a retired Russian athlete who specialised in the 100 metres hurdles. She represented her country at the 2000 Summer Olympics reaching the semifinals.

Her personal bests of 12.72 seconds in the 100 metres hurdles (2001) and 7.95 seconds in the 60 metres hurdles (1998).

Her husband was the football player Sergey Dmitriyev.

Doping rule violation
Laukhova was disqualified from the 2001 IAAF World Indoor Championships because of an anti-doping rule violation.

Competition record

See also
List of doping cases in athletics
List of European Athletics Indoor Championships medalists (women)
Russia at the World Athletics Championships
Doping at the World Athletics Championships

References

1973 births
Living people
Russian female hurdlers
Olympic athletes of Russia
Athletes (track and field) at the 2000 Summer Olympics
Universiade medalists in athletics (track and field)
Universiade bronze medalists for Russia
Medalists at the 1997 Summer Universiade
Medalists at the 1995 Summer Universiade
Competitors at the 1998 Goodwill Games
World Athletics Championships athletes for Russia
Russian Athletics Championships winners
Russian sportspeople in doping cases
Doping cases in athletics